Astilbe japonica, called false buck's beard, is a species of flowering plant in the genus Astilbe, native to Japan, and introduced in New York State. Its hybrid cultivars 'Deutschland', 'Montgomery', and 'Rheinland' have gained the Royal Horticultural Society's Award of Garden Merit.

References

japonica
Endemic flora of Japan
Plants described in 1841
Taxa named by Joseph Decaisne
Taxa named by Charles François Antoine Morren